Champlemy is a commune in the Nièvre department in central France.

Demographics
In 2019, the population was 325.

See also
Communes of the Nièvre department

References

Communes of Nièvre